Adrienn Hormay (born 7 October 1971) is a Hungarian fencer. She competed in the épée events at the 1996 and 2004 Summer Olympics. She won a gold medal at the 2008 European Fencing Championships.

References

External links
 
 

1971 births
Living people
Hungarian female épée fencers
Olympic fencers of Hungary
Fencers at the 1996 Summer Olympics
Fencers at the 2004 Summer Olympics
Sportspeople from Pécs
21st-century Hungarian women